Annie Laurie (tentatively identified as Annie L. Page, August 11, 1924 – November 13, 2006) was an American jump blues and rhythm and blues singer. She is most associated with the bandleader  and songwriter, Paul Gayten, although she also registered hit singles in her own name. Laurie first recorded in the mid-1940s and her professional career lasted until the early 1960s.  Appraisal of her qualities appear to vary between Dinah Washington stating that Laurie was her favorite singer, to Irma Thomas, who opined - "Annie Laurie? She was okay."

She is best known for her cover version of "Since I Fell for You", and another US Top Ten R&B hit, "It Hurts to Be in Love."

Life and career
Laurie was born in Atlanta, Georgia, United States.  Her personal details are obscure, but she has been tentatively identified by blues researchers Bob Eagle and Eric LeBlanc as Annie L. Page, born there in 1924.

Her singing career started by vocalising for two territory bands led by Dallas Bartley and Snookum Russell, on the Chitlin' Circuit. In 1945, she recorded a version of "Saint Louis Blues" with the Bartley led band for Cosmo Records.  She relocated to New Orleans, Louisiana, and was engaged by Paul Gayten. In 1947, she was performing in concert in New Orleans with Gayten, when the latter asked the young Fats Domino to come and play "Swanee River Boogie" on stage.  Recording for both the  Regal and De Luxe labels between 1947 and 1950, Laurie sang on several sides backed by Gayten's orchestra.  Her first success was with her version of "Since I Fell for You" (1947), of which recording studio owner Cosimo Matassa said: "Annie Laurie did the first really good record that I liked... [She] was just fantastic, I mean nobody will ever make another version like that."  She followed its success up with "Cuttin' Out" (1949), "You Ought To Know" (1950), "I Need Your Love" (1950), "Now That You're Gone" (1950) and "I'll Never Be Free" (1950). Laurie also toured with Gayten's orchestra in 1951.

Laurie's association with Regal Records ended in 1951, and she started recording for Okeh.  By 1956 her releases were issued on Savoy Records, for whom she recorded in New York City with Hal Singer's orchestra, featuring guitarist Mickey Baker.  Her biggest hit came in 1957 when De Luxe Records released "It Hurts to Be in Love," which was co-written by Julius Dixson and Rudy Toombs.  Other releases with De Luxe included the Andy Gibson co-written track, "Hand in Hand" and "Love Is A Funny Thing (both 1957). In July 1960, Laurie appeared in concert, sharing the bill with Screamin' Jay Hawkins, the Five Satins, Joe Turner, Faye Adams, Ben E. King, and Nappy Brown, at Chicago's Regal Theater. The same month she had her final chart hit with "If You're Lonely."

By 1962, her affiliation had switched to Ritz Records, and she recorded several sides for them.  However she left the music industry at this time, devoting herself to the Jehovah's Witnesses.

According to Eagle and LeBlanc, she died in Titusville, Florida, in 2006, aged 82.

Discography

Chart singles

Compilation albums

See also
List of jump blues musicians

References

1924 births
2006 deaths
American blues singers
American rhythm and blues singers
20th-century African-American women singers
Jump blues musicians
Musicians from Atlanta
20th-century American singers
20th-century American women singers
21st-century African-American people
21st-century African-American women